This article presents a list of the historical events and publications of Australian literature during 1900.

Events 

 April - Henry Lawson departs Australia for London in order to further his literary career.  The venture proved ultimately unsuccessful.

Books 

 Louis Becke 
 Edward Barr: South Sea Pearler
 Thomas Wallis: A Tale of the South Seas
 Guy Boothby
 A Cabinet Secret
 "Long Live the King!"
 A Maker of Nations
 My Indian Queen
 A Prince of Swindlers (aka The Viceroy's Protegé)
 The Woman of Death
 Ada Cambridge – Path and Goal
 Simpson Newland – Blood Tracks of the Bush: An Australian Romance
 A. B. Paterson – An Outback Marriage
 Ethel Turner
 The Convalescence of Taffie Farndon
 Gum Leaves
 Three Little Maids

Short stories 

 Edward Dyson – "The Funerals of Malachi Mooney"
 Henry Lawson
 "The Iron-Bark Chip"
 "Joe Wilson's Courtship"
 On the Track
 Over the Sliprails
 Steele Rudd – "Baptising Bartholomew"

Poetry 

 Ethel Castilla – An Australian Girl and other verses
 Victor J. Daley – "When London Calls"
 George Essex Evans – "Ode for Commonwealth Day"
 James Hebblethwaite – A Rose of Regret
 Henry Lawson – Verses, Popular and Humorous
 Bernard O'Dowd – "Australia"
 A.B. Paterson – "There's Another Blessed Horse Fell Down"
 David McKee Wright
 New Zealand Chimes
 Wisps of Tussock: New Zealand Rhymes

Drama 

 C. Haddon Chambers – The Tyranny of Tears: A Comedy in Four Acts
 Gilbert Murray – Andromache: A Play in Three Acts

Births 

A list, ordered by date of birth (and, if the date is either unspecified or repeated, ordered alphabetically by surname) of births in 1900 of Australian literary figures, authors of written works or literature-related individuals follows, including year of death.

 10 May – Frances Margaret McGuire, writer, biochemist and philanthropist (died 1995)
 10 August – Charles Shaw, novelist (died 1955)
 13 August – A. A. Phillips, writer and critic (died 1985)
 20 October – Jack Lindsay, journalist, novelist and poet (died 1990)

Deaths 

A list, ordered by date of death (and, if the date is either unspecified or repeated, ordered alphabetically by surname) of deaths in 1900 of Australian literary figures, authors of written works or literature-related individuals follows, including year of birth.

 30 October – Charles de Boos, journalist and novelist (born 1819)

See also 
 1900 in poetry
 List of years in literature
 List of years in Australian literature
 1900 in literature
 1899 in Australian literature
 1900 in Australia
 1901 in Australian literature

References

Literature
Australian literature by year
19th-century Australian literature
1900 in literature